Sarah Blake Bateman (born June 15, 1990) is an American-born competition swimmer who has represented Iceland in international events.  She was born and raised in the United States, but has dual citizenship from her Icelandic maternal grandmother Johanna Hjaltalin.

At the 2008 Summer Olympics, she competed in the 100 m backstroke, but did not advance beyond the first round.

At the 2012 Summer Olympics she finished 32nd overall in the preliminary heats in the 100-meter butterfly, and did not advance.  In the 50-meter freestyle heats, she tied for 16th with two other swimmers and took part in a qualification swim-off, but did not advance.  She was part of the Icelandic 4 × 100 m medley team, but that team also did not advance beyond the first round.

References

1990 births
Living people
American people of Icelandic descent
Icelandic female backstroke swimmers
Icelandic female freestyle swimmers
Florida Gators women's swimmers
Icelandic people of American descent
Icelandic female butterfly swimmers
Olympic swimmers of Iceland
Sportspeople from Orlando, Florida
Swimmers at the 2008 Summer Olympics
Swimmers at the 2012 Summer Olympics